Howard is a city in and the county seat of Elk County, Kansas, United States.  As of the 2020 census, the population of the city was 570.

History

Howard was founded in 1870, and it was incorporated as a city in 1877. Howard was named after Oliver O. Howard, a Union Army general during the Civil War and founder of Howard University.  The first post office in Howard was established in February, 1870. As of 1901, Howard was a sundown town where African Americans were not allowed to live.

Geography
Howard is located at  (37.468517, -96.263014).

Climate
The climate in this area is characterized by hot, humid summers and generally mild to cool winters.  According to the Köppen Climate Classification system, Howard has a humid subtropical climate, abbreviated "Cfa" on climate maps.

Demographics

2010 census
As of the census of 2010, there were 687 people, 318 households, and 176 families residing in the city. The racial makeup of the city was 95.1% White, 1.6% Native American, 0.4% Asian, 0.6% from other races, and 2.3% from two or more races. Hispanic or Latino of any race were 4.1% of the population.

There were 318 households, of which 22.3% had children under the age of 18 living with them, 43.1% were married couples living together, 8.8% had a female householder with no husband present, 3.5% had a male householder with no wife present, and 44.7% were non-families. 41.2% of all households were made up of individuals, and 22.7% had someone living alone who was 65 years of age or older. The average household size was 2.03 and the average family size was 2.74.

The median age in the city was 49.6 years. 19.9% of residents were under the age of 18; 6.7% were between the ages of 18 and 24; 17.6% were from 25 to 44; 27.3% were from 45 to 64; and 28.5% were 65 years of age or older. The gender makeup of the city was 47.3% male and 52.7% female.

2000 census
As of the census of 2000, there were 808 people, 350 households, and 215 families residing in the city. The racial makeup of the city was 94.93% White, 0.25% African American, 1.24% Native American, 0.62% Asian, 0.62% from other races, and 2.35% from two or more races. Hispanic or Latino of any race were 1.98% of the population.

There were 350 households, out of which 24.0% had children under the age of 18 living with them, 51.7% were married couples living together, 6.3% had a female householder with no husband present, and 38.3% were non-families. 37.4% of all households were made up of individuals, and 23.7% had someone living alone who was 65 years of age or older. The average household size was 2.16 and the average family size was 2.83.

In the city, the population was spread out, with 22.4% under the age of 18, 5.4% from 18 to 24, 19.2% from 25 to 44, 22.8% from 45 to 64, and 30.2% who were 65 years of age or older. The median age was 47 years. For every 100 females, there were 81.6 males. For every 100 females age 18 and over, there were 78.6 males.

The median income for a household in the city was $25,822, and the median income for a family was $28,365. Males had a median income of $24,886 versus $16,354 for females. The per capita income for the city was $15,441. About 11.9% of families and 14.5% of the population were below the poverty line, including 17.2% of those under age 18 and 14.6% of those age 65 or over.

Education
The community is served by West Elk USD 282 public school district.  School unification consolidated Moline, Howard and Severy schools forming USD 282. West Elk High School is located in Howard. The West Elk High School mascot is Patriots.

Prior to school unification, the Howard High School mascot was Pirates.

See also
 National Register of Historic Places listings in Elk County, Kansas

References

Further reading

External links

 City of Howard
 Howard - Directory of Public Officials
 Howard city map, KDOT

Cities in Kansas
County seats in Kansas
Cities in Elk County, Kansas
Sundown towns in Kansas